Menthoxypropanediol (also known as Cooling agent 10 [tradename of Takasago]), is a synthetic derivative of menthol. While the cooling strength of 3-(l-menthoxy)propane-1,2-diol is accepted as being about 20–25% that of menthol, it is also noted that "in a Vaseline ointment, 3-(l-menthoxy)propane-1,2-diol shows a cool feeling 2.0 to 2.5 times stronger than that of l-menthol". It is used in various cosmetic chemical concoctions.

References

Flavors
Cooling flavors
Analgesics
Monoterpenes
Vicinal diols
Isopropyl compounds